The following article presents a summary of the 2019 football (soccer) season in Brazil, which was the 118th season of competitive football in the country.

Campeonato Brasileiro Série A

The 2019 Campeonato Brasileiro Série A started on April 27, 2019 and ended on December 8, 2019.

Athletico Paranaense
Atlético Mineiro
Avaí
Bahia
Botafogo
Ceará
Chapecoense
Corinthians
Cruzeiro
CSA
Flamengo
Fortaleza
Fluminense
Goiás
Grêmio
Internacional
Palmeiras
Santos
São Paulo
Vasco da Gama

Flamengo won the league.

Relegation
The four worst placed teams, Cruzeiro, CSA, Chapecoense and Avaí, were relegated to the following year's second level.

Campeonato Brasileiro Série B

The 2019 Campeonato Brasileiro Série B started on April 26, 2019 and ended on November 30, 2019.

 América Mineiro
 Atlético Goianiense
 Botafogo (SP)
 Bragantino
 Brasil de Pelotas
 Coritiba
 CRB
 Criciúma
 Cuiabá
 Figueirense
 Guarani
 Londrina
 Oeste
 Operário Ferroviário
 Paraná
 Ponte Preta
 São Bento
 Sport
 Vila Nova
 Vitória

Bragantino won the league.

Promotion
The four best placed teams, Bragantino, Sport, Coritiba and Atlético Goianiense, were promoted to the following year's first level.

Relegation
The four worst placed teams, Londrina, São Bento, Criciúma and Vila Nova, were relegated to the following year's third level.

Campeonato Brasileiro Série C

The 2019 Campeonato Brasileiro Série C started on April 27, 2019 and ended on October 6, 2019.

ABC
Atlético Acreano
Boa Esporte
Botafogo (PB)
Confiança
Ferroviário
Globo
Imperatriz
Juventude
Luverdense
Náutico
Paysandu
Remo
Sampaio Corrêa
Santa Cruz
São José
Tombense
Treze
Volta Redonda
Ypiranga

The Campeonato Brasileiro Série C final was played between Náutico and Sampaio Corrêa.

Náutico won the league after beating Sampaio Corrêa

Promotion
The four best placed teams, Náutico, Sampaio Corrêa, Juventude and Confiança, were promoted to the following year's second level.

Relegation
The four worst placed teams, ABC, Globo, Luverdense and Atlético Acreano, were relegated to the following year's fourth level.

Campeonato Brasileiro Série D

The 2019 Campeonato Brasileiro Série D started on May 4, 2019 and ended on August 18, 2019.

Altos
América de Natal
América (PE)
Anapolina
Aparecidense
ASA
Atlético Cearense
Atlético Roraima
Avenida
Bahia de Feira
Barcelona
Boavista
Bragantino (PA)
Brasiliense
Brusque
Caldense
Campinense
Caxias
Central
Cianorte
Corumbaense
Coruripe
Fast Clube
Ferroviária
Floresta
Fluminense de Feira
Foz do Iguaçu
Galvez
Gaúcho
Hercílio Luz
Interporto
Iporá
Itabaiana
Itaboraí
Ituano
Jacuipense
Joinville
Juazeirense
Manaus
Maranhão
Maringá
Moto Club
Novorizontino
Operário
Palmas
Patrocinense
Portuguesa (RJ)
Real Ariquemes
Rio Branco (AC)
River
Salgueiro
Santa Cruz de Natal
Santos (AP)
São Caetano
São Raimundo (PA)
São Raimundo (RR)
Sergipe
Serra
Serrano
Sinop
Sobradinho
Tubarão
Tupi
União Rondonópolis
URT
Vitória das Tabocas
Vitória (ES)
Ypiranga (AP)

The Campeonato Brasileiro Série D final was played between Brusque and Manaus.

Brusque won the league after defeating Manaus.

Promotion
The four best placed teams, Brusque, Manaus, Ituano and Jacuipense, were promoted to the following year's third level.

Domestic cups

Copa do Brasil

The 2019 Copa do Brasil started on February 5, 2019 and ended on September 18, 2019. The Copa do Brasil final was played between Athletico Paranaense and Internacional.

Athletico Paranaense won the cup after defeating Internacional.

Copa do Nordeste

The competition features 16 clubs from the Northeastern region. It started on January 15, 2019 and ended on May 29, 2019. The Copa do Nordeste final was played between Fortaleza and Botafogo (PB).

Fortaleza won the cup after defeating Botafogo (PB).

Copa Verde

The competition featured 24 clubs from the North and Central-West regions, including two teams from Espírito Santo. It started on July 24, 2019 and ended on November 20, 2019. The Copa Verde final was played between Cuiabá and Paysandu.

Cuiabá won the cup after defeating Paysandu.

State championship champions

State cup competition champions

Youth competition champions

(1) The Copa Nacional do Espírito Santo Sub-17, between 2008 and 2012, was named Copa Brasil Sub-17. The similar named Copa do Brasil Sub-17 is organized by the Brazilian Football Confederation and it was first played in 2013.

Brazilian clubs in international competitions

Brazil national team
The following table lists all the games played by the Brazilian national team in official competitions and friendly matches during 2019.

Friendlies

Copa América

Women's football

Campeonato Brasileiro de Futebol Feminino Série A1

The 2019 Campeonato Brasileiro de Futebol Feminino Série A1 started on March 16, 2019 and ended on September 29, 2019.

Audax
Corinthians
Ferroviária
Flamengo/Marinha

Internacional
Iranduba
Kindermann/Avaí
Minas/ICESP
Ponte Preta
Santos
São Francisco
São José
Sport/Ipojuca
Vitória

The Campeonato Brasileiro de Futebol Feminino Série A1 final was played between Ferroviária and Corinthians.

Ferroviária won the league after defeating Corinthians.

Relegation
The four worst placed teams, Vitória das Tabocas/Santa Cruz, Foz Cataratas/Athletico Paranaense, São Francisco and Sport/Ipojuca, were relegated to the following year's second level.

Campeonato Brasileiro de Futebol Feminino Série A2

The 2019 Campeonato Brasileiro de Futebol Feminino Série A2 started on March 27, 2019 and ended on August 25, 2019.

3B da Amazônia
Aliança
América Mineiro
Atlético Acreano
Atlético Mineiro
Botafogo
Botafogo (PB)
Canindé
Ceará
Chapecoense
CRESSPOM
Cruzeiro
Cruzeiro (RN)
Duque de Caxias
ESMAC
Fluminense
Grêmio
Lusaca/Bahia
Moreninhas
Náutico
Operário Ltda.
Oratório
Palmeiras
Pinheirense
Porto Velho
Portuguesa (SP)
Santa Quitéria
São Paulo
São Raimundo (RR)
São Valério
Taubaté
Tiradentes
Toledo/Ouro Verde
UDA/CSA
Vasco da Gama
Vila Nova (ES)

The Campeonato Brasileiro de Futebol Feminino Série A2 final was played between São Paulo and Cruzeiro.

São Paulo won the league after defeating Cruzeiro.

Promotion
The four best placed teams, São Paulo, Cruzeiro, Palmeiras and Grêmio, were promoted to the following year's first level.

Domestic competition champions

State cup competition champions

Youth competition champions

Brazilian clubs in international competitions

National team
The following table lists all the games played by the Brazil women's national football team in official competitions and friendly matches during 2019.

The Brazil women's national football team competed in the following competitions in 2019:

Friendlies

2019 SheBelieves Cup

2019 FIFA Women's World Cup

2019 Torneio Uber Internacional de Futebol Feminino

2019 Yongchuan International Tournament

References

External links
 Brazilian competitions at RSSSF

 
Seasons in Brazilian football